Myoglanis is a genus of three-barbeled catfishes native to tropical South America.

Species
There are currently three recognized species in this genus:
 Myoglanis aspredinoides DoNascimiento & Lundberg, 2005
 Myoglanis koepckei F. Chang, 1999
 Myoglanis potaroensis C. H. Eigenmann, 1912

References

Heptapteridae
Fish of South America
Catfish genera
Taxa named by Carl H. Eigenmann
Freshwater fish genera